This is a list of the Spanish PROMUSICAE Top 20 Singles number-ones of 2000.

Chart history

See also
2000 in music
List of number-one hits (Spain)

References

2000
Spain Singles
Number-one singles